Namsan cable car is an aerial tramway in Seoul. Built in 1962, it spans from the Hoehyeon-dong platform (near Myeong-dong) to the Yejang-dong platform near the top of Mt. Namsan and the N Seoul Tower. It is the first commercial cable car service for passengers in Korea.

The length of the cable is 605 metres. The altitude difference of 138 metres makes a gradient of 13°. The cabins move at a speed of 3.2 m/s. The transit between platforms takes about three minutes.

An elevator, opened in June 2009 by the Seoul Metropolitan Government, operates from near the entrance of Namsan Tunnel Three up to the cable car station. It runs along the slope of Namsan with a capacity for 20 passengers to provide better access for the disabled and senior citizens.

References

External links 
  

Aerial tramways in South Korea
Tourist attractions in Seoul
1962 establishments in South Korea